Nils Ørvik (3 January 1918 – 10 February 2005) was a Norwegian historian, born in Skåtøy. He was appointed professor of international politics at the Queen's University in Kingston, Ontario in 1973.In 1975 he created the Queen's Centre for International Relations (now known as the Centre for International and Defence Policy), and was its director until his retirement in 1985.

Selected works
 
 (two volumes)
 
 
.

References

1918 births
2005 deaths
People from Kragerø
20th-century Norwegian historians
Academic staff of Queen's University at Kingston